Edmond Tomić (born 10 November 1956 in Prizren, SR Serbia, SFR Yugoslavia) is a former football player.

Starting his career with Liria Prizren, where he played for three seasons, he moved to HNK Rijeka where he stayed for six seasons. He was Rijeka's top scorer during the 1981-82 season of Yugoslav First League. During his time with Rijeka, he was at the centre of controversy when Rijeka defeated Dinamo Zagreb 2–1 during the 1978–79 Yugoslav First League season. Dinamo claimed that Edmond Tomić, who joined Rijeka that season from Liria, didn't serve a one-match suspension following two yellow cards received while playing for his former club. They appealed and after two months it has been decided to award the match 3–0 to Dinamo. After several appeals from both sides, in spring 1979 Football Association of Yugoslavia ruled in favour of Rijeka. The case was brought to Employment Appeal Tribunal, which four years later ruled Dinamo as champions but HNK Hajduk Split remained registered as champions for the 1978-79 season. In 1984, he moved to Austria, where he played for various clubs, including SV Spittal/Drau and FC Salzburg until he retired.

Club statistics
 *Incomplete

Honours
NK Rijeka
Yugoslav Cup: 1979
Balkans Cup: 1978

FC Salzburg
Regionalliga West: 1989-90

Individual
Austrian Football First League top scorer: 1989

References

1956 births
Living people
Yugoslav footballers
Association football forwards
KF Liria players
HNK Rijeka players
SV Spittal players
FC Red Bull Salzburg players
Yugoslav First League players
Expatriate footballers in Austria